Marie Dauchy (born 5 February 1987 in Calais) is a French politician from the National Rally who has been a Member of the European Parliament since 2022.

References 

1987 births
Living people
National Rally (France) politicians
21st-century French politicians
21st-century French women politicians
National Rally (France) MEPs
MEPs for France 2019–2024
21st-century women MEPs for France